Lucky Dog Recordings 03–04 is the debut solo album by Tindersticks frontman Stuart A. Staples, released in 2005 on the Lucky Dog label. The album features contributions from Terry Edwards and Yann Tiersen, alongside some of Staples' Tindersticks colleagues. The first track, "Somerset House", featured in the closing credits of the fourth episode of Eastbound & Down, in 2009.

Track listing 
"Somerset House"
"Marseilles Sunshine"
"Say Something Now"
"Friday Night"
"Shame on You"
"Untitled"
"Dark Days"
"People Fall Down"
"She Don't Have to be Good to Me"
"I've Come a Long Way"

References 

2005 debut albums
Stuart A. Staples albums